Raymond John Healy (September 21, 1907 – July 17, 1997) was an American anthologist who edited four science fiction anthologies from 1946 to 1955, two with J. Francis McComas. Their first collaboration, Adventures in Time and Space, (1946) is generally recognized as the finest early anthology from the Golden Age of Science Fiction.

Books edited
 Adventures in Time and Space (1946), with J. Francis McComas
 New Tales of Space and Time (1951) 
 9 Tales of Space and Time (1954)
 Selections from Adventures in Time and Space (1954), paperback, subset of stories from the hardback 
 More Adventures in Time and Space (1955), paperback, subset of stories from the hardback

References

External links

 

1907 births
1997 deaths
American book editors
Science fiction editors
American speculative fiction editors